The Vanualevu slender treeskink (Emoia mokosariniveikau) is a species of lizard in the family Scincidae. It is found in Fiji.

References

Emoia
Reptiles described in 1995
Taxa named by George Robert Zug
Taxa named by Ivan Ineich